Pennsylvania's 29th congressional district was one of Pennsylvania's districts of the United States House of Representatives.

Geography
From 1903 to 1923 the district was located in western Pennsylvania near Pittsburgh.  From 1923 to 1933 the district moved to northwest Pennsylvania near Erie.  In 1933 the district returned to include portions of Pittsburgh.  The district was eliminated in 1963.

History
The 29th district was created in 1903 and eliminated in 1963.

List of members representing the district

References

 Congressional Biographical Directory of the United States 1774–present

29
Former congressional districts of the United States
1903 establishments in Pennsylvania
1963 disestablishments in Pennsylvania
Constituencies established in 1903
Constituencies disestablished in 1963